The men's changquan competition at the 2018 Asian Games was held on 19 August at the Jakarta International Expo. It was the first set of medals to be awarded in the 2018 Asian Games.

Schedule
All times are Western Indonesia Time (UTC+07:00)

Results
Legend
DNS — Did not start

References

External links
Official website

Men's changquan